MacAlpine Hills are a chain of mainly ice-free, bluff-type hills in Antarctica, extending from Mount Achernar southwestwards along the south side of Law Glacier, to Sylwester Glacier. They were named by the Advisory Committee on Antarctic Names for Ensign Kenneth D. MacAlpine, U.S. Navy Reserve; a member of U.S. Navy Squadron VX-6, MacAlpine was injured in an airplane crash at McMurdo Sound, October 1956.

References

Hills of the Ross Dependency
Shackleton Coast